Ezrin also known as cytovillin or villin-2 is a protein that in humans is encoded by the EZR gene.

Structure 

The N-terminus of ezrin contains a FERM domain which is further subdivided into three subdomains. The C-terminus contain an ERM domain.

Function 

The cytoplasmic peripheral protein encoded by this gene can be phosphorylated by protein-tyrosine kinase in microvilli and is a member of the ERM protein family. This protein serves as a linker between plasma membrane and actin cytoskeleton.  It plays a key role in cell surface structure adhesion, migration, and organization.

The N-terminal domain (also called FERM domain) binds sodium-hydrogen exchanger regulatory factor (NHERF) protein (involving long-range allostery).  This binding can happen only when ezrin is in its active state. The activation of ezrin occurs in synergism of the two factors: 1) binding of the N-terminal domain to  phosphatidylinositol(4,5)bis-phosphate (PIP2) and 2) phosphorylation of threonine T567 in  the C-terminal domain. Binding to actin filaments (via C-terminal) and to membrane proteins (via N-terminal) stabilizes the protein's conformation in its active mode. The membrane proteins like CD44 and ICAM-2 are indirect binding partners of ezrin, while EBP50 (ERM binding protein 50) can associate with ezrin directly.

Interactions 
VIL2 has been shown to interact with:

 CD43, 
 FASLG, 
 ICAM-1, 
 ICAM2, 
 ICAM3, 
 Merlin, 
 MSN, 
 PIK3R1,
 PALLD 
 S100P, 
 SDC2, 
 SLC9A3R1, 
 SLC9A3R2,  and
 VCAM-1.

References

Further reading